The Walter M602 is a turboprop aircraft engine produced by Walter Aircraft Engines of the Czech Republic, used on the Let L-610.

Applications
 Let L-610

Specification

See also

References

1980s turboprop engines
M602